The 2013 Challenge Bell was a tennis tournament played on indoor carpet courts. It was the 21st edition of the Challenge Bell, and was part of the WTA International tournaments of the 2013 WTA Tour. It took place at the PEPS de l'Université Laval in Quebec City, Canada, from September 9 through September 15, 2013.

Points and prize money

Point distribution

Prize money

Singles main draw entrants

Seeds

1 Rankings are as of August 26, 2013

Other entrants
The following players received wildcards into the singles main draw:
 Stéphanie Dubois
 Lucie Šafářová  
 Aleksandra Wozniak

The following players received entry from the qualifying draw:
 Julie Coin
 Sesil Karatantcheva  
 Melanie Oudin 
 Amra Sadiković

Retirements
 Petra Martić (gastrointestinal illness)
 Bethanie Mattek-Sands (right knee injury)

Doubles main draw entrants

Seeds

1 Rankings are as of August 26, 2013

Other entrants
The following pairs received wildcards into the doubles main draw:
 Françoise Abanda /  Carol Zhao
 Sofia Arvidsson /  Stéphanie Dubois

The following pair received entry as alternates:
 Chieh-yu Hsu /  Nicole Melichar

Withdrawals
Before the tournament
 Eugenie Bouchard (right thigh injury)

Champions

Singles

 Lucie Šafářová def.  Marina Erakovic, 6–4, 6–3

Doubles

 Alla Kudryavtseva /  Anastasia Rodionova def.  Andrea Hlaváčková /  Lucie Hradecká, 6–4, 6–3

References

External links
Official website

Challenge Bell
Tournoi de Québec
Challenge Bell
Challenge Bell
2010s in Quebec City